Thomas or Tom Meyer may refer to:
 Thomas Meyer (businessman), Swiss businessman, founder of the clothing brand Desigual
 Tom Meyer (politician) (1942–2007), member of the Michigan House of Representatives
 Tom Meyer (Bible Memory Man) (born 1976), American speaker, college professor, Bible memorization expert, and author
 Tom Meyer (basketball) (1922–2019), American basketball player
 Tommy Meyer (born 1990), American soccer player
 Tom Meijer (born 1938), also known as Tom Meyer, host of the Happy Station Show on Radio Netherlands